The 1979 Gongola State gubernatorial election occurred on July 28, 1979. GNPP's Abubakar Barde won election for a first term to become Gongola State's first executive governor leading with 47.6%, defeating main opposition NPN's candidate, Ahmed Mahmudu Ribadu, who polled 34.6% in the contest.

Abubakar Barde emerged GNPP's flag bearer after defeating his closest contestant, Wilberforce Juta, who later became his running mate, at the party primary election by a margin of just three votes.

Electoral system
The Governor of Gongola State is elected using the plurality voting system.

Results
Three of the five political parties registered by the Federal Electoral Commission (FEDECO) participated in the election. Abubakar Barde of the GNPP won the contest by polling the highest votes of 47.6%. The total number of registered electorates was 2,284,500. A total of 650,725 votes were cast.

References 

Gongola State gubernatorial election
Gongola State gubernatorial elections
July 1979 events in Nigeria